Platynota polingi is a species of moth  of the family Tortricidae. It is found in Arizona in the United States.

References

Moths described in 2012
Platynota (moth)